The American singer Whitney Houston released seven studio albums, six compilations, three soundtrack albums, five box sets, six extended plays, and 57 singles. She has sold over 200 million records worldwide, becoming one of the best-selling music artists in history. According to the Recording Industry Association of America (RIAA), Houston is the best-selling female R&B artist of the 20th century, and has sold 100 million certified records in the United States. She is also the fourth best-selling female album artist in the US with 61 million certified album sales. In addition, until the launch of the RIAA's digital certification program in 2004, she had sold 16.5 million physical singles—more than any other female solo artist in history. According to the Official Charts Company in October 2012, Houston is the fourth-biggest-selling female singles artists of all-time list with a sales total of 8.5 million singles in that country. 

In 1985, Whitney Houston released her self-titled debut album. It spent 14 weeks at No.1 on the Billboard 200 and was certified 14× platinum by the Recording Industry Association of America (RIAA) for 14 million units sold in US, with global sales of 25 million copies. The album produced four US top 5 singles, including three Billboard Hot 100 No.1 singles; "Saving All My Love for You", "How Will I Know", and "Greatest Love of All". In 1987, Houston released her second album Whitney. The album peaked at No.1 on the Billboard 200 and produced five US top ten singles with the first four hitting number-one; "I Wanna Dance with Somebody (Who Loves Me)", "Didn't We Almost Have It All", "So Emotional", and "Where Do Broken Hearts Go", which established a record seven consecutive No.1 hits by a performer. " Love Will Save The Day" became the album's fifth top ten hit. Whitney was certified diamond by the RIAA, giving the artist her second diamond album, and topped the charts in numerous countries and sold in excess of 20 million copies worldwide. Houston's third studio album, I'm Your Baby Tonight (1990), peaked at number three on the Billboard 200 chart and yielded three US top ten singles, two of which hit number-one; "I'm Your Baby Tonight" and "All the Man That I Need", selling 10 million units worldwide. In February 1991, Houston released "The Star Spangled Banner" performance from Super Bowl XXV as a single, it became the highest-charting rendition of the American national anthem on the Billboard Hot 100 chart.

The Bodyguard soundtrack from her film debut, was released in November 1992. The album contains tracks by other recording artists but is considered a Houston album by Billboard. It topped the Billboard 200 for 20 non-consecutive weeks, one of the longest tenures by an album in the Nielsen SoundScan era. The album was certified 18× platinum in the United States, giving the artist her third diamond album, and sold over 45 million copies worldwide, becoming the best-selling album by a female artist, the best-selling soundtrack album of all time, and one of the top 3 best-selling albums of all time. The lead single from the soundtrack, "I Will Always Love You", topped the Billboard Hot 100 chart for a then-record-breaking fourteen weeks and the song alone was certified Diamond in the United States, peaked at number one on the charts in nearly every country and sold over 20 million copies globally, becoming the best-selling physical single by a female act and one of the best-selling singles of all time. Houston contributed three songs, including her 11th number-one single "Exhale (Shoop Shoop)" on the 7× platinum soundtrack album, Waiting to Exhale (November 1995). The following year she released The Preacher's Wife in November 1996. The soundtrack has sold six million copies worldwide, certified 3× platinum in the US, and is the best-selling gospel album of all time. In 1998, she released the studio album My Love Is Your Love. The album went on to achieve multi-platinum status with 10 million units sold worldwide, being certified 4× platinum in the United States. From late 1998 to early 2000, the album generated five singles; "When You Believe" (duet with Mariah Carey); "Heartbreak Hotel" (with Faith Evans and Kelly Price; "It's Not Right but It's Okay"; "My Love Is Your Love"; and "I Learned from the Best".

Houston entered the 2000s with her first greatest hits compilation, Whitney: The Greatest Hits, released in May 2000. The double-disc has been certified 5× platinum in the United States. The album hit the top position on the UK Albums Chart and sold over 1.66 million copies in the UK alone. It reached number one and the top 10 in many international markets, selling 10 million copies globally. Just Whitney, released in December 2002, became her first album after renewing her contract with Arista Records for the largest recording contract in history, a record $100 million deal in 2001. The album received platinum status in the US, and sold two million copies worldwide, but became her lowest-selling album to date. Houston released a Christmas album, One Wish: The Holiday Album in November 2003, which was certified gold in the US, quite a respectable number for a holiday album. In September 2009, Houston returned to the top position on the Billboard 200 chart with her album I Look to You, becoming her fourth number-one album on the chart. It also topped the album charts of several European countries and was certified platinum by the RIAA. Her albums Whitney Houston, Whitney, The Bodyguard  and Whitney: The Greatest Hits are among the top 100 certified albums according to the RIAA. In 2020, Houston became the first black artist ever to have three diamond-certified albums; Whitney Houston, Whitney, and The Bodyguard each shipped over 10 million copies in the US alone.

Albums

Studio albums

Soundtracks

Compilation albums

Live albums

Reissues

Box sets

Extended plays

Notes

References

External links
 Official website
 [ Billboard chart history]
 UK chart database
 German chart database
 The British Phonographic Industry (BPI) sales certificate database
 Recording Industry Association of America (RIAA) sales certificate database
 Rock on the net.com
 Whitney Houston' photos and music
 
 

discography
Discographies of American artists
Pop music discographies
Soul music discographies